Operation Chieftain was a Royal Navy operation during the Second World War.

Designed to support Operation Crusader, a decoy convoy, GM 3, was assembled, in an attempt to divert Axis aircraft away from the land battle. Five merchantmen, the oiler Brown Ranger, a sloop, a destroyer, and three corvettes left Gibraltar on 16 November 1941. The freighters were to turn back after dark and return independently while the escort conducted a two day anti-submarine sweep. 

One corvette had engine trouble, sailed late and sank a German U-boat. Force K contributed to the deception by sailing westwards from Malta to simulate a rendezvous with GM 3, then reversing course overnight. 

A second diversion force, as Operation Landmark, left Malta early on 21 November, feigning a voyage to Alexandria to escort four merchant ships. For added verisimilitude, the battle squadron at Alexandria sailed as if to meet the ships from Malta.

B-Dienst (Observation Service) learnt from British naval signals Force K was at sea, so an Italian convoy and escorts were ordered to port rather than risk battle.

Notes

Sources 

 

 
Battle of the Mediterranean
Mediterranean Sea operations of World War II
Malta in World War II
Naval battles and operations of World War II involving the United Kingdom